The 2020–21 BYU Cougars women's volleyball team represents Brigham Young University in the 2020–21 NCAA Division I women's volleyball season. The Cougars are led by sixth year head coach Heather Olmstead and play their home games at the Smith Fieldhouse. The Cougars are members of the WCC.

BYU comes off a season where they finished second in the WCC regular season championship. The Cougars received an at-large bid and once again participated in the NCAA tournament before falling to Utah in the second round.

Due to the COVID-19 coronavirus, the 2020 fall season was delayed until winter/spring, and the Cougars were scheduled to play a conference only schedule. However when the Santa Clara series was postponed, BYU was able to set up a non-conference match with Utah Valley.

Season highlights
Will be filled in as the season progresses.

Roster

Schedule

 *-Indicates Conference Opponent
 y-Indicates NCAA Playoffs
 Times listed are Mountain Time Zone.

Announcers for televised games
All home games will be on BYUtv or the BYUtv App. All road game will also be televised or streamed on WCC Network. 
Portland: No commentary
Portland: No commentary
Utah Valley: Matthew Baiamonte & Kayli Doxey
Gonzaga: Jarom Jordan (Set 1), Spencer Linton (Sets 2–4), & Amy Gant
Gonzaga: Spencer Linton & Amy Gant
Loyola Marymount: Spencer Linton & Amy Gant
Loyola Marymount: Spencer Linton & Amy Gant
Pepperdine: Al Epstein
Pepperdine: Al Epstein 
San Francisco: Charlie Walter
San Francisco: Charlie Walter
San Diego: Jack Cronin
San Diego: Jarom Jordan  & Amy Gant
Saint Mary's: Charlie Walter
Saint Mary's: Ben Ross
Santa Clara: Jarom Jordan & Amy Gant
Santa Clara: Jarom Jordan & Amy Gant
UCLA: Paul Sunderland
Wisconsin: Tyler Denning & Jenny Hazelwood

References
For information on BYU's other athletic sports this season please check out the following:

2020 team
2021 in sports in Utah
BYU
BYU
BYU